The Cierva C.25 was a British 1930s single-seat autogiro produced by Comper Aircraft Company Ltd of Hooton Park, Cheshire.

Design and development
The sole C.25, based on the airframe of the Comper Swift with modified tailfins and short low-mounted wings, received the civil registration G-ABTO. It was the first autogiro to use the Pobjoy Cataract 7-cylinder geared radial engine.

Specifications

References 

C.25
Autogyros
Single-engined tractor autogyros